Colonel Rupert Ashworth Ramon de Larrinaga (born 19 November 1928) is a former British skier who competed in the 1952 Winter Olympics in the giant slalom. A colonel in the British Army, de Larrinaga served in the occupation of Germany, eventually rising to command King's Regiment (Liverpool). He was also a director of the family-run Larrinaga Steamship Company Ltd. He appeared on Isle of Man stamps in 1994 in celebration of the centenary of the International Olympic Committee.

References

External links
 

1928 births
Living people
British male alpine skiers
Olympic alpine skiers of Great Britain
Alpine skiers at the 1952 Winter Olympics
King's Regiment officers
King's Regiment (Liverpool) officers
Sportspeople from Liverpool
British people of Basque descent
British expatriates in Germany
20th-century British Army personnel